Chukiatan, also known as (Chutiatan on google map) is a small town 9 km from proper Dir Town. It is the main route for Barawal Bandi, and Kohistan (Kumrat). It is the place where three rivers meet each other. (River Dir, River Kohistan, River Barawal Bandi) River Kohistan is the biggest in all these. Chukiatan has several picnic spots on the bank of the river and also has fishing spots, people from all over Dir Upper and lower come for fishing. Chukiatan is also known for his greenery and people hospitality.

Most of the people from Chukiatan work in foreign countries, mostly in the Middle East. Other occupations are farming, business and self-employment.

One of the biggest Frontier Crop DIR reside in Chukiatan.

Government of Khyber Pakhtunkhwa

Government of Pakistan

External links

Populated places in Kohistan District, Pakistan